Mary Pratt may refer to:

 Mary Pratt (painter) (1935–2018), Canadian painter
 Mary Pratt (baseball) (1918−2020), former pitcher
 Mary Louise Pratt (born 1948), professor of Spanish and Portuguese languages and literature
 Mary Ann Pratt, midwife and early member of the Latter Day Saint movement
 Mary Pradd, English woman murdered in 1876